One Line is a 2017 South Korean crime-thriller film written and directed by Yang Kyung-mo, that starred Im Si-wan, Jin Goo, Park Byung-eun, Lee Dong-hwi and Kim Sun-young.

Synopsis
The story of a relatively ordinary college student who meets a legendary swindler.

Cast

 Im Si-wan as Min-jae
 Jin Goo as Suk-goo
 Park Byung-eun as Ji-won
 Lee Dong-hwi as Senior Manager Song
 Kim Sun-young as Assistant Manager Hong
 Ahn Se-ha as Detective Chun
 Park Jong-hwan as Ki-tae
 Kim Hong-pa as Director Baek
 Park Yu-hwan as Hyuk-jin
 Park Hyung-soo as Secretary Han
 Wang Ji-won as Hae-sun
 Kim Gook-hee as Joo-hee
 Jo Woo-jin as Prosecutor Won
 Lee Suk-ho as Moon-soo
 Lee Do-hyun as Mr. Park
 Park Sung-yeon as Ms. Choi
 Oh Min-ae as Joo-hee's Mother 
 Park Keun-rok as Hotel Man
 Na Soo-yoon as Min-jae's Loan Employee
 Shin Dong-ryuk as Mr. Ma
 Kwon Bum-taek as Vice President Kwon of Dong-ah Bank
 Kim Jung-soo as Vice President Kim of Seoul Bank
 Shin Jung-sup as Vice President Shin of Jo-sun Bank
 Kang Jin-ah as Cemetery Employee
 Kim Ga-eun as Employee of Saessak Loan
 Jun Kwang-jin as Sky Lounge Customer
 Kim Keun-young as Pork Restaurant Owner 
 Lee Il-hwa as Young-hee (cameo)

Production
The filming began in January 2016.

References

External links
 
 
 

2017 films
South Korean crime thriller films
2010s Korean-language films
Next Entertainment World films
2010s South Korean films